The European Journal for Philosophy of Religion (EJPR) is a quarterly, peer-reviewed academic journal of philosophy of religion. 
As a publisher independent journal, EJPR is not primarily profit-oriented but strives to encourage high-quality discussions in philosophy of religion among scholars representing different philosophical and theological schools of thought within this field of research. Originally founded by the Polish philosopher Janusz Salamon in 2009 to promote particularly discussions in the philosophy of religion in Europe, it was transferred to Austria (Innsbruck) in 2017 and developed in recent years into an internationally highly respected journal. 
Georg Gasser (Augsburg University, Germany) served as main editor with T. Ryan Byerly (University of Sheffield) as Reviews Editor from 2017-2022.

References

English-language journals
Philosophy journals
Quarterly journals
Religious philosophical literature